The House of Plantagenet was a royal house founded by Geoffrey V of Anjou.

Plantagenet may refer to:

History
Angevin Empire, also referred to as the Plantagenet Empire, a modern term describing the collection of states once ruled by the Angevin-Plantagenet dynasty
Armorial of Plantagenet, the coats of arms known or believed to be borne by Geoffrey V of Anjou and his descendants
House of Lancaster Plantagenet house of Lancaster, a branch of the royal House of Plantagenet
House of York Plantagenet house of York, a branch of the royal House of Plantagenet

Geography
Plantagenet County, Queensland, Australia
Electoral district of Plantagenet, a historical electoral district in Western Australia
Plantagenet County, Western Australia 
Plantagenet Land District, a land district of Western Australia
Shire of Plantagenet, a local government area in Western Australia
Lake Plantagenet, a lake in Minnesota, US

Other uses
The Plantagenets, a 2014 BBC miniseries about the dynasty
HMS Plantagenet (1801), a 74-gun third rate ship of the line of the Royal Navy
Plantagenet (radio plays), a sequence of radio plays by Mike Walker
Plantagenet style, an architectural building design of churches and cathedrals during the 12th century

People with the name
Arthur Plantagenet, 1st Viscount Lisle, a son of King Edward IV of England
Cecily Plantagenet, more commonly known as Cecily of York, an English Princess 
Geoffrey Plantagenet, Count of Anjou, the founder of this house
Hamelin Plantagenet, more commonly known as Hamelin de Warenne, Earl of Surrey
Henry Plantagenet, most commonly known as Henry II of England, the first of the House of Plantagenet to rule England
Honor Plantagenet, Viscountess Lisle, an English lady-in-waiting during the reign of Henry VIII
John Plantagenet, more commonly known as John of Lancaster, 1st Duke of Bedford 
Mary Plantagenet, more commonly known as Mary of Waltham
Philippa Plantagenet, more commonly known as Philippa, 5th Countess of Ulster
Plantagenet Somerset Fry, born Peter George Robin Fry, a British historian   
William Plantagenet, more commonly known as William de Warenne, 5th Earl of Surrey

Fictional
Plantagenet Palliser, a character in the Palliser series of novels

See also
Alfred and Plantagenet, a township in eastern Ontario, Canada 
List of members of the House of Plantagenet
Catherine Plantagenet (disambiguation)
Edmund Plantagenet (disambiguation), 
Edward Plantagenet (disambiguation)
Eleanor Plantagenet (disambiguation)
Elizabeth Plantagenet (disambiguation)
Geoffrey Plantagenet (disambiguation)
George Plantagenet (disambiguation)
Humphrey Plantagenet (disambiguation)
Joan of England (disambiguation)
Margaret Plantagenet (disambiguation)
Richard Plantagenet (disambiguation)
House of York, a branch of the English royal House of Plantagenet
The Nation, Ontario or South Plantagenet, a community